Żywiec is a town on the River Soła in southern Poland with 31,194 inhabitants (2019). It is situated within the Silesian Voivodeship, near the Żywiec Lake and Żywiec Landscape Park, one of the eight protected areas in the voivodeship. Historically, the town has been part of the Lesser Poland region and is the capital of the Żywiecczyzna region, which is ethnically part of the Goral Lands.

The 551231 Żywiec planetoid is named after the town.

History
Żywiec was first mentioned in a written document in 1308 as a seat of a Catholic parish. It was originally located in the place later known as Stary Żywiec (lit. "Old Żywiec"). It belonged then to the Duchy of Cieszyn, and after 1315 to the Duchy of Oświęcim, which in 1327 became a fief of the Kingdom of Bohemia. The town was a focal point for the development of hitherto sparsely populated Żywiec Basin. The area of Stary Żywiec was prone to flooding so the town was moved to the current spot in 1448. In 1457 the Duchy of Oświęcim was purchased and incorporated directly to the Polish Crown. Żywiec was a private town, administratively located in the Kraków Voivodeship in the Lesser Poland Province of the Polish Crown. In 1624 it was sold by the Komorowski family to Constance of Austria, queen consort of the Polish king Sigismund III Vasa. During the Deluge, Żywiec was plundered and destroyed by Swedish troops in 1656. From 1672 it was a possession the Polish chancellor (Kanclerz) Jan Wielopolski.

The Old Castle was built in the mid-14th century. The castle has undergone several restorations and boasts a number of styles of architecture and decoration, including Gothic, Renaissance and Baroque. Żywiec's Old Castle is encompassed by a 260,000 square metre landscape park, which was established initially in the 17th century.

The Church of the Holy Cross was built towards the end of the 14th century, and expanded twice, once in 1679 and again in 1690. In the 18th century, a Baroque church was later constructed on the site and still stands today. A second noteworthy church, the Cathedral of the Virgin Mary's Birth, was constructed and expanded during the first half of the 15th century, before being renovated in Baroque fashion after a fire in 1711.

Upon the First Partition of Poland in 1772, Żywiec became part of the Austrian Kingdom of Galicia. In 1810 it was purchased by Prince Albert of Saxony, son of King Augustus III of Poland and again ruled with the neighbouring Silesian Duchy of Teschen (Cieszyn). When he died in 1822, his estates fell to Archduke Charles from the Austrian House of Habsburg-Lorraine. The town also houses the Żywiec Brewery, established by Charles' son Archduke Albert in 1852, and purchased by Heineken International in the 1990s. A museum was founded at the site in 2006. At the beginning of World War I, over 1,000 soldiers of the Polish Legions from the region marched out from Żywiec to fight for Polish independence; 167 of them died in the war. At the end of the war, in 1918, Poland regained independence and control of the town. Eight Poles from Żywiec were killed in the Polish–Soviet War of 1919–1920.

Second World War

Following the 1939 Invasion of Poland, which started World War II, Żywiec was occupied by Nazi Germany. The last Habsburg owner Archduke Karl Albrecht of Austria refused to sign the German Volksliste, whereafter he was ousted and arrested.

26 Poles from Żywiec were murdered by the Russians in the large Katyn massacre in April–May 1940.

Between September and December 1940, the Nazi authorities expelled 17,413–20,000 Polish inhabitants from around Żywiec county in the so-called Action Saybusch conducted by Wehrmacht and Gestapo. A transit camp for expelled Poles was located at the local school. The expelled Poles were taken to the General Government, a different region within Poland under German military occupation. The incident formed part of the Nazis' efforts, led by Reich Minister Alfred Rosenberg and his deputy Alfred Meyer, to develop the Occupied Eastern Territories for settlement by German migrants. In 1941, Nazi German Oberpräsident of Upper Silesia Fritz Bracht, while visiting the town, declared that there will be no Poles in the county in five years. German occupation ended in 1945.

Economy
The Żywiec Brewery is located in the town. There is a museum dedicated to the brewery.

Sports
There are several football clubs in the town: men teams Koszarawa Żywiec, Czarni-Góral Żywiec, Soła Żywiec, and women team TS Mitech Żywiec. All four teams compete in the lower leagues, although Mitech also played in the Ekstraliga (Polish top division) until 2020.

Notable people

Archduke Charles Stephen of Austria (1860–1933), aristocrat
Archduke Karl Albrecht of Austria (1888–1951), aristocrat
Alice Habsburg (1889–1985), aristocrat
Archduke Leo Karl of Austria (1893–1939), aristocrat
Wilhelm Brasse (1917–2012) photographer, Auschwitz prisoner
Tadeusz Wrona (born 1954), aviator
Tomasz Adamek (born 1976), boxer
Piotr Haczek (born 1977), athlete
Agata Wróbel (born 1981), weightlifter
Tomasz Jodłowiec (born 1985), footballer

Twin towns – sister cities

Żywiec is twinned with:

 Adur, England, United Kingdom

 Čadca, Slovakia
 Feldbach, Austria
 Gödöllő, Hungary
 Liptovský Mikuláš, Slovakia
 Opava, Czech Republic
 Riom, France
 Storuman, Sweden
 Szczytno, Poland
 Unterhaching, Germany

Gallery

References

External links
Jewish Community in Żywiec on Virtual Shtetl

 
Cities and towns in Silesian Voivodeship
Żywiec County
Lesser Poland
Kraków Voivodeship (14th century – 1795)
Populated places in the Kingdom of Galicia and Lodomeria
Kraków Voivodeship (1919–1939)
Province of Upper Silesia